Port Said University is a university in Port Said, Egypt. It was established in 2010, after the decision of the Egyptian president to establish this university to transfer Suez Canal branch in Port Said to an independent university. The history of the university extends before the decision of its establishment; as the existence of its first faculties was the faculty of engineering in 1975 under the supervision of Helwan University, then under the supervision of Suez Canal University when it was established in 1976. After that, more faculties were established in Port Said Governorate increasing to four faculties prompting the decision of establishing Port Said University as a branch of the Suez Canal University in 1998. The decision of the Republic President, for establishing Port Said University in 2010, was the result of the continuous increase of the faculties outreaching nine Educational institutions. Now, Port Said University consists of thirteen faculties including: faculty of Engineering; faculty of Medicine; faculty of Pharmacy; faculty of Science; faculty of Commerce; faculty of Education; faculty of Physical Education; faculty of Specific Education; faculty of nursing; Faculty of education for early childhood; faculty of Arts;  faculty of Law and faculty of Management Technology And Information Systems.

Faculties

At the time it became an independent institution in 2010, it had the following faculties:
 Faculty of Engineering
 Faculty of Commerce
 Faculty of Education
 Faculty of Physical Education
 Faculty of Specific Education
 Faculty of Nursing
 Faculty of Education For Early Childhood
 Faculty of Science
 Faculty of Arts
 Faculty of Management Technology and Information Systems
 Faculty of Medicine
 Faculty of Pharmacy
 Faculty of Law

See also
Educational institutions in Port Said
Education in Egypt
Egyptian universities
List of Egyptian universities

External links
Port Said University official website

Universities in Egypt
Educational institutions established in 2010
Port Said
2010 establishments in Egypt